Nufenoxole (SC-27166) is an antidiarrhoeal drug which acts as a peripherally selective opioid agonist, in a similar manner to loperamide and diphenoxylate. While it is able to activate μ-opioid receptors, it fails to cross the blood–brain barrier and so has a selective action against diarrhoea without producing analgesic effects.

See also 
 Dipipanone
 Dipyanone
 Desmethylmoramide

References 

Antidiarrhoeals
Mu-opioid receptor agonists
Oxadiazoles
Peripherally selective drugs